343 Ostara (prov. designation:  or ) is a background asteroid from the inner region of the asteroid belt. It was discovered by German astronomer Max Wolf at the Heidelberg Observatory on 15 November 1892.

References

External links 
 
 

000343
Discoveries by Max Wolf
Named minor planets
000343
000343
18921115